William Killick (14 May 1855 — 2 April 1938) was an English cricketer. He was a right-handed batsman who played for Surrey. He was born in Reigate and died in Horley.

Killick made a single first-class appearance for the team, during the 1876 season, against Nottinghamshire. Batting in the upper-middle order, he scored a duck in the first innings in which he batted, and three runs in the second.

External links
William Killick at Cricket Archive

1855 births
1938 deaths
English cricketers
Surrey cricketers
People from Reigate